Weaver Knob is a summit in West Virginia, in the United States.

Weaver Knob was so named for the fact an early settler there had the occupation of weaver.

References

Mountains of Greenbrier County, West Virginia
Mountains of West Virginia